The 2001–02 season was the 91st season in Hajduk Split’s history and their 11th in the Prva HNL. Their first place finish in the 2000–01 season meant it was their 11th successive season playing in the Prva HNL.

Competitions

Overall record

Prva HNL

Classification

Results summary

Results by round

Results by opponent

Source: 2001–02 Croatian First Football League article

Matches

Prva HNL

Source: hajduk.hr

Croatian Football Cup

Source: hajduk.hr

Champions League

UEFA Cup

Source: hajduk.hr

Player seasonal records

Top scorers

Source: Competitive matches

See also
2001–02 Croatian First Football League
2001–02 Croatian Football Cup

References

External sources
 2001–02 Prva HNL at HRnogomet.com
 2001–02 Croatian Cup at HRnogomet.com
 2001–02 UEFA Champions League at rsssf.com
 2001–02 UEFA Cup at rsssf.com

HNK Hajduk Split seasons
Hajduk Split